Michael Hackett from New South Wales is an Australian Paralympic athlete.  He won a  silver medal at the 1988 Seoul Paralympics in the Men's High Jump A4A9 event and a bronze medal at the 1992 Barcelona Paralympics in the Men's High Jump J2 event.

References

External links
 
 

Year of birth missing (living people)
Living people
Paralympic athletes of Australia
Paralympic silver medalists for Australia
Paralympic bronze medalists for Australia
Paralympic medalists in athletics (track and field)
Athletes (track and field) at the 1988 Summer Paralympics
Athletes (track and field) at the 1992 Summer Paralympics
Medalists at the 1988 Summer Paralympics
Medalists at the 1992 Summer Paralympics
Australian male high jumpers
High jumpers with limb difference
Paralympic high jumpers